Tau Koloamatangi (born 3 January 1995 in New Zealand) is a Tongan rugby union player, who currently plays for  in New Zealand's domestic National Provincial Championship competition and for Moana Pasifika in Super Rugby. His playing position is prop.

Reference list

External links
 

1995 births
Living people
People educated at Wesley College, Auckland
New Zealand rugby union players
Rugby union props
Tongan rugby union players
Hong Kong rugby union players
Hong Kong international rugby union players
Waikato rugby union players
Otago rugby union players
Moana Pasifika players
Tonga international rugby union players